Softshell turtle may refer to some members of the softshell turtles (Trionychidae family): 

 Asiatic softshell turtle
 Florida softshell turtle
 Smooth softshell turtle
 Spiny softshell turtle
 Asian narrow-headed softshell turtle
 Burmese narrow-headed softshell turtle
 Indian narrow-headed softshell turtle
 Malayan softshell turtle
 Black softshell turtle
 Burmese peacock softshell
 Indian softshell turtle
 Indian peacock softshell turtle
 Leith's softshell turtle
 Wattle-necked softshell turtle 
 Asian giant softshell turtle
 New Guinea giant softshell turtle
 Northern New Guinea giant softshell turtle
 Chinese softshell turtle
 Hunan softshell turtle
 Lesser Chinese softshell turtle
 Northern Chinese softshell turtle
 Spotted softshell turtle
 Euphrates softshell turtle
 Yangtze giant softshell turtle
 African softshell turtle

See also 
 Softshell (disambiguation)
 

Animal common name disambiguation pages